Sarah Noble Intermediate School is an intermediate school located in the historic town of New Milford, Connecticut. The school was named after Anglo-American girl Sarah Noble.

In 1707, John Noble Sr., previously of Westfield, Massachusetts and his eight-year-old daughter Sarah Noble were the first Anglo-American settlers.

References

 "New Milford History", Learning Zone section, Historical Society of New Milford Website, accessed August 2, 2006

External links
 

Public middle schools in Connecticut
New Milford, Connecticut
Schools in Litchfield County, Connecticut